Dos Estaciones is a 2022 Mexican-Spanish language drama film directed by Juan Pablo González. It premiered in the World Cinematic Dramatic Competition at the 2022 Sundance Film Festival, where lead actress Teresa Sánchez won the Special Jury Prize for Acting. 

The film has won awards and screened at festivals such as New Directors/New Films at MoMA and the Lincoln Center, San Sebastián, Edinburgh, Morelia, New Horizons, Athens, Zurich, Bogota International Film Festival, Vancouver International Film Festival, and Mostra São Paulo, among others. 

Dos Estaciones participated at the Venice Biennale Cinema-College and the Sundance Institute’s Creative Producing Fellowship.

Plot
The film centers 50 year old María García, the owner of Dos Estaciones, a once-majestic tequila factory struggling to stay afloat and the final hold-over from generations of Mexican-owned tequila plants in the highlands of Jalisco; the rest have folded to foreign corporations. Once one of the wealthiest people in town, María knows her current financial situation is untenable. When a persistent plague and an unexpected flood cause irreversible damage, Maria is forced to do everything she can to save her community's main source of economy and pride.

Cast 
Teresa Sánchez as María García
Rafaela Fuentes as Rafita
Tatín Vera as Tatís
Manuel García Rulfo as Pepe

Accolades

Critical Response 
Writing for The Hollywood Reporter, Sheri Linden said "It's rare when a debut feature strikes the perfect balance of ingredients and especially rare when it does so in a distinctive and memorable way."

Manohla Dargis for The New York Times named the film a NYT Critics' Pick and called it "visually arresting."

References 

https://www.screendaily.com/news/cinema-guild-picks-up-sundance-award-winner-dos-estaciones/5169620.article

https://www.cinematropical.com/cinema-tropical/dos-estaciones-and-what-we-leave-behind-nominated-for-the-gotham-awards

https://iffboston.org/2022-awards/

External links